Banque Belge pour L’Etranger v Hambrouck [1921] 1 KB 321 is an English trusts law case concerning the common law remedies for receipt of trust property.

Facts
Mr Hambrouck forged cheques so £6000 came out of the account of Mr Pelabon at the Banque Belge pour l'Étranger, his employer, and was put into his own Farrow’s Bank account. Then Mr Hambrouck took out money and paid his mistress Mlle Spanoghe, who gave no consideration. She paid the money to her account at the London Joint City and Midland Bank, where she had £315 credit. Banque Belge sued Mr Hambrouck, Mlle Spanoghe and the London Bank for the money. The London Bank paid the money into court.

Salter J held the money should be repaid.

Judgment
The Court of Appeal held that the money should be repaid. Atkin LJ noted the argument of Hambrouck that title could not be asserted because after passing through other bank accounts, it could no longer be identified. But In re Hallett’s Estate said that was not a problem because any transfer to an innocent donee would defeat an original owner’s claim. He said the following.

Bankes LJ and Scrutton LJ gave concurring judgments, although somewhat narrower in scope.

Aftermath
In Agip (Africa) Ltd v Jackson, Fox LJ held that a claim at common law could not succeed, because Agip’s money had been mixed in the New York clearing system and could not therefore be traced. An equitable claim, although more restrictive in application, was still available against some of the defendants. In distinguishing the case from Banque Belge, he said:

Ellinger's Modern Banking Law viewed the two cases as reaching substantially the same conclusion:

The reasoning in Banque Belge has also helped to expand the application of Norwich Pharmacal orders. In Bankers Trust v Shapira, Denning MR observed:

See also

English trusts law

References

English trusts case law
English banking case law
Court of Appeal (England and Wales) cases
1921 in British law
1921 in case law